Ralph Robert Kiffmeyer (born November 23, 1945) is a nurse anesthetist who served in the Minnesota House of Representatives from January 8, 1985, to January 5, 1987. He was elected as a Republican and represented parts of Benton and Sherburne counties. He was defeated in his bid for re-election by Democrat Jerry Bauerly. He is married to former Minnesota Secretary of State and current state senator Mary Kiffmeyer. They live near Big Lake, Minnesota.

References

1945 births
Living people
People from Sherburne County, Minnesota
American people of German descent
Republican Party members of the Minnesota House of Representatives